Singaporoidea is an Asian genus of stick insects in the family Lonchodidae and subfamily Necrosciinae.

Species 
The Phasmida Species File lists:

 Singaporoidea albilateralis (Hennemann, 1998)
 Singaporoidea dolorosa (Redtenbacher, 1908)
 Singaporoidea enganensis (Giglio-Tos, 1910)
 Singaporoidea evae Seow-Choen, 2018
 Singaporoidea fruhstorferi (Günther, 1938)
 Singaporoidea gracillimus (Werner, 1934)
 Singaporoidea inconspicua (Redtenbacher, 1908)
 Singaporoidea jambia Seow-Choen, 2018
 Singaporoidea janaae (Seow-Choen, 2017)
 Singaporoidea janus (Bates, 1865)
 Singaporoidea lutea (Redtenbacher, 1908)
 Singaporoidea macra (Redtenbacher, 1908)
 Singaporoidea meneptolemus (Westwood, 1859)
 Singaporoidea nigragenua Seow-Choen, 2018
 Singaporoidea nigropunctata Seow-Choen, 2018
 Singaporoidea normalis (Redtenbacher, 1908)
 Singaporoidea nurulae Seow-Choen, 2020
 Singaporoidea planicercata (Redtenbacher, 1908)
 Singaporoidea poeciloptera (Rehn, 1904)
 Singaporoidea pseudosipylus (Redtenbacher, 1908)
 Singaporoidea pumila (Werner, 1934)
 Singaporoidea shifui (Seow-Choen, 2016)
 Singaporoidea tenella (Günther, 1935)

References 

Phasmatodea genera
Phasmatodea of Asia
Insects described in 2017
Lonchodidae